William Frederick Meggers (July 13, 1888 – November 19, 1966) was an American physicist specialising in spectroscopy.

Born in Clintonville, Wisconsin, he had to combine his early schooling with working on the family farm, but earned a scholarship to Ripon College, receiving a bachelor's degree in physics in 1910 and working as a research assistant. After a few years at the Carnegie Institute of Technology (now Carnegie Mellon University) in Pittsburgh, Pennsylvania, in 1914 he joined the National Bureau of Standards, and while working there earned his PhD from Johns Hopkins University.

His work in spectrochemistry is generally credited to have sparked interest in the field in the United States, leading to him being dubbed the Dean of American spectroscopists.

In 1947 he received the Frederic Ives Medal. He was awarded the Elliott Cresson Medal in 1953. Since 1970, the Optical Society of America has awarded the William F. Meggers Award for outstanding work in spectroscopy.

In 1965, Dr. Meggers and his wife, Edith R. Meggers, donated their coin and stamp collections to the American Institute of Physics, for the express purpose of establishing a biennial award program for the improvement of physics teaching at the high school level. Awards have been presented since 1994.

The Meggers crater on the Moon is named in his honor.

His daughter and oldest child was Betty J. Meggers, who also received her doctorate and became a noted archeologist at the Smithsonian Institution in Washington, DC, specializing in South American pre-Columbian archeology. He also had two sons, William F. Meggers Jr. (1924-2000) and John C. Meggers (1928-1966).

There are two awards named in his honor: The Optical Society's William F. Meggers Award and the Applied Spectroscopy William F. Meggers Award.

References

External links
National Academy of Sciences Biographical Memoir
American Institute of Physics Meggers Project Award
Arcs and Sparks January, 1967 article

1888 births
1966 deaths
People from Clintonville, Wisconsin
Ripon College (Wisconsin) alumni
Johns Hopkins University alumni
20th-century American physicists